Microstelma columbella is a species of minute sea snail, a marine gastropod mollusk or micromollusk in the family Zebinidae.

Distribution

Description 
The maximum recorded shell length is 10 mm.

Habitat 
Minimum recorded depth is 289 m. Maximum recorded depth is 402 m.

References

Zebinidae
Gastropods described in 1881